Thomas McInnes (22 March 1869 – 17 January 1939) was a Scottish professional footballer. McInnes was capped once for Scotland, against Ireland in 1889.

Football career
McInnes was born in Glasgow. He joined local club Cowlairs, playing as a forward, most often at outside right. His performances for Cowlairs earned him a cap for the Scotland national team, on 9 March 1889 against Ireland in the 1889 British Home Championship. Scotland won the match 7–0, and McInnes scored the last goal, in the 88th minute.

McInnes scored 67 goals from 226 appearances playing as an inside forward for Notts County between 1889 and 1893. McInnes played on the losing side for Notts County against Blackburn Rovers in the 1891 FA Cup Final. During 1892, he briefly returned to Scotland to play for Rangers. Upon his return to Notts County, McInnes was suspended for a month by the Football Association because his move to Rangers breached their rules.

McInnes later played for Everton and Luton Town in the Football League and for Third Lanark in the Scottish Football League. On 13 October 1894, McInnes scored the opening goal in the first ever Merseyside derby, which Everton won 3–0.

References

1869 births
1939 deaths
Footballers from Glasgow
Scottish footballers
Association football forwards
Scotland international footballers
Cowlairs F.C. players
Notts County F.C. players
Rangers F.C. players
Third Lanark A.C. players
Everton F.C. players
Luton Town F.C. players
Scottish Football League players
English Football League players
English Football League representative players
FA Cup Final players